The 2012–13 Rutgers Scarlet Knights men's basketball team represented Rutgers University during the 2012–13 NCAA Division I men's basketball season. The Scarlet Knights, led by third year head coach Mike Rice Jr., played their home games at the Louis Brown Athletic Center, better known as The RAC, and were members of the Big East Conference. They finished the season 15–16, 5–13 in Big East play to finish in 12th place. They lost in the second round of the Big East tournament to Notre Dame.

This was their last year as a member of the Big East Conference. The so-called Catholic 7 members of the Big East will separate themselves from the conference, along with Butler, Creighton and Xavier, to form a new conference that retains the Big East Conference name. In 2013–14, Rutgers will be part of the American Athletic Conference. They will only play in the AAC for one season as they will join the Big Ten Conference in 2014–15.

Head coach Mike Rice Jr. was fired April 3, 2013. Assistant coach Jimmy Martelli resigned on April 4, 2013.

Roster

Schedule

|-
!colspan=9| Exhibition

|-
!colspan=9| Regular season

|-
!colspan=9| Big East tournament

References

Rutgers Scarlet Knights men's basketball seasons
Rutgers
2012 in sports in New Jersey
2013 in sports in New Jersey